Blessing Edoho (born 5 September 1992 in Nigeria) is a Nigerian  footballer who plays defender.

International career
Edoho made her international debut in the 2010 FIFA U-20 Women's World Cup.
In May 2015 Edoho was called up to play for team Nigeria in the 2015 FIFA Women's World Cup.

References

External links
 
 

1992 births
Living people
Nigerian women's footballers
2015 FIFA Women's World Cup players
Women's association football midfielders
Nigeria women's international footballers
Pelican Stars F.C. players